Tunceli (Zazaki: Mamekiye; Armenian: Մամիկի, Māmāki; Kurmanji: Kalan; Ottoman Turkish: دسم, Desīm) is a municipality (belde) in Tunceli District and capital of Tunceli Province, Turkey. The city has a Kurdish-majority population and was a site of the Dersim rebellion. It had a population of 35,161 in 2021.

Name

During Ottoman times, the settlement was called Kalan or Mameki. Tunceli, which is a modern name, literally means "bronze fist" in Turkish (tunç meaning "bronze" and eli, in this context, meaning "fist"). It shares the name with the military operation under which the Dersim massacre was conducted. The province of Dersim (or Dêsim) was renamed Tunceli in 1935, as was the settlement of Kalan, which became the province's administrative center in 1938. Dersim is popularly understood to be composed of the Kurdish/Zazaki words der ("door") and sim ("silver"), thus meaning "silver door."  Whether the town should be called Dersim or Tunceli has been a cause of political quarrels. In May 2019, the local authorities decided to call it Dersim, while the governor said it was against the law to call it Dersim.

History

During the time of the Ottoman Empire, Tunceli (then known as Kalan) was a part of the region named Dersim. In 1847, Dersim was declared a sanjak (a historical administrative unit smaller than the province). The capital of the sanjak was Hozat. During the Republican period, Tunceli Province was established in 1935. In 1946, the former town of Kalan was renamed as Tunceli and it was declared as the capital city of the province.

As a result of the Turkish campaign of "Turkification" Tunceli became a main target of Turkish officials after the establishment of the Turkish Republic in 1923. Tunceli played a role in the Dersim rebellion by the Kurds.

Tunceli is famous for excellent rankings in National Education statistics.

Politics 
In the Municipal Elections which took place on 31st of March 2019, Fatih Mehmet Maçoğlu was elected Mayor. He is the first mayor of Tunceli from the Communist Party of Turkey.

In 2018, Turkish president Recep Tayyip Erdoğan stated that if "those involved with terrorism" (referring to the HDP party) were to win the elections, that his government would "appoint trustees without delay".

In May 2019 the Municipal Council decided to use the city's historic name Dersim and also to offer municipal services in Zazaki and Kurmanji. 4 Members of the newly elected municipal council had their certificates revoked in May 2019 for having been dismissed from public office in the past.

Economy
The main economic activity is animal breeding. Wheat is the only notable agricultural product. There are chromium, salt and marble deposits, but only salt is produced. There are a few factories based on agriculture.

Climate
Tunceli has a continental climate (Köppen: Dsa, Trewartha: Dc) with very hot, dry summers and cold, snowy winters.

See also

Munzur Valley National Park
Seyid Riza
Sophene

Notes

Tunceli
Cities in Turkey
Turkish Kurdistan
Populated places in Tunceli Province
Kurdish settlements in Tunceli Province